"Oil" is the second episode of British sitcom The Young Ones. It was written by Ben Elton, Rik Mayall and Lise Mayer, and directed by Paul Jackson. It was first aired on BBC2 on 16 November 1982.

Plot 
The guys settle into their new house after the destruction of their previous abode in the show's pilot episode and allocate the bedrooms. As Rick and Vyvyan argue over one bedroom, Mike discovers Buddy Holly in his, having survived the plane crash on The Day the Music Died by parachuting out and smashing through the roof. He is still tangled in the parachute and hanging upside down from the ceiling, and he proceeds to sing Mike a song about the diet of insects on which he has subsisted since that day in 1959. Mike dreams of getting rich off the song, but his plan ends abruptly when Holly falls loose and hits the floor, breaking his neck. Dragging the body into the cellar, Mike discovers two elderly men lying on their backs under a bare light bulb and hallucinating that they are adrift at sea. Rick and Vyvyan give the room they have been arguing over to Neil after Vyvyan sets its bed on fire, and Mike briefly converts Rick's room into a roller disco and charges him admission to enter.

After a solo match of Murder in the Dark, Vyvyan announces that he has struck oil in the cellar, and instantly forms a coalition with Mike (whom Vyvyan calls "El Presidente") to extract and sell it. They decide to use Rick and Neil as slave labor, with Vyvyan enforcing discipline by beating the two with a cricket bat as they lie on the floor. After Neil inadvertently impales Vyvyan through the head with a pickaxe while digging for the oil, Rick tries to start a workers' revolution and organizes a benefit concert in the house. The effort fails, though, as the band (fronted by Alexei Sayle in his Balowski persona) demands a large fee and Rick has not bothered to sell any tickets.

During the end credits, a disoriented but conscious Vyvyan stumbles around the cellar, swinging a pickaxe at random. He ends by addressing the camera, saying that he lied about finding oil.

The episode featured a performance of "Doctor Martens' Boots" by the fictional electronic band Radical Posture, with Sayle on lead vocals.

Characters 
As with all episodes of The Young Ones, the main four characters were student flatmates Mike (Christopher Ryan); Vyvyan (Adrian Edmondson); Rick (Rik Mayall) and Neil (Nigel Planer). Alexei Sayle appeared as Alexei Balowski, a protest singer and nephew of the students' landlord Jerzei.

Home video edits 
Early VHS and DVD releases feature edits to the original version of this episode.

The opening scene featured Cliff Richard's "Travellin' Light" as the main cast approaches their new home. When the song could not be cleared for commercial releases, the song was removed entirely. Due to the recording of the original dialogue no longer existing, the cast members returned to re-record their dialogue for early VHS and DVD releases.

A similar edit occurs during the basement scene in which Vyvyan criticises Rick for not working hard enough, before head butting the ground to speed up the digging, leading to Neil accidentally putting the pick axe through Vyvyan's head. The scene began with an obscure Roy C song from 1973 called "I'm Bustin' My Rocks (Working on the Chain Gang)" playing on Rick's radio. Once again, the inability to clear the song for commercial releases led to the section of the scene where it can be heard to be trimmed to only show the pickaxe event and aftermath.

Both scenes were restored to their original unedited versions on The Young Ones: Complete Series One & Two DVD set released in October 2007, released in the US as The Young Ones: Extra Stoopid Edition in November 2007.

References

External links

The Young Ones episodes
1982 British television episodes
Cultural depictions of Buddy Holly
Television shows written by Ben Elton